The 2002 Wilkes-Barre/Scranton Pioneers season was the team's first season.  The team finished with a 6–10 record under head coach Terry Karg, finishing fourth out of five in the American Conference Northeast Division; they did not go to the playoffs.  Following the season, Karg resigned as head coach.

Schedule

Regular season

Final standings

Attendance

References

External links
ArenaFan Online 2002 af2 schedule
ArenaFan Online 2002 af2 standings
ArenaFan Online 2002 af2 attendance

Wilkes-Barre/Scranton Pioneers seasons
2002 in American football
Wilkes-Barre Scranton Pioneers